Joshua Treadwell McCown (born July 4, 1979) is an American football coach and former quarterback who is the quarterbacks coach for the Carolina Panthers of the National Football League (NFL). He played college football for SMU for three seasons before transferring to Sam Houston State. McCown was drafted by the Arizona Cardinals in the third round of the 2002 NFL Draft and played for them for four seasons. He spent most of his career as a journeyman quarterback playing for twelve different teams including; the Arizona Cardinals, Detroit Lions, Oakland Raiders, Miami Dolphins, Carolina Panthers, San Francisco 49ers, Chicago Bears, Tampa Bay Buccaneers, Cleveland Browns, New York Jets, Philadelphia Eagles, and Houston Texans, along with a stint with the Hartford Colonials of the United Football League (UFL). He retired after the 2018 season and joined ESPN as an analyst, but returned to the NFL during the preseason and joined the Eagles. He is an older brother of former NFL quarterback Luke McCown and a younger brother of former Texas A&M quarterback Randy McCown.

While with SMU, McCown passed for 4,022 yards, 27 touchdowns, and 34 interceptions in three seasons with the team. In his only season with the Bearkats, he threw for 3,481 yards, 32 touchdowns and 12 interceptions, earning Southland Football League Player of the Year and Third-team Division I-AA All-American honors.

Early years
McCown grew up on a ranch in Jacksonville, Texas, and attended Jacksonville High School. He had a significant growth spurt in high school that helped his football career. McCown later said, "My first driver's license said 5-foot-4. At 16, I was 5–4." A coach of McCown's also said, "We knew Josh was going to be a good football player if he ever grew, but it sure took a while. He really started shooting up in the second half of his junior year." In McCown's senior year in 1997, he led the team to the playoffs and was the East Texas Player of the Year, District 17-4A Offensive Player of the Year, and an All-State honorable mention. He also played basketball and won All-District second team honors as a shooting guard his senior year. The Jacksonville Chamber of Commerce inducted him into their Wall of Fame in 2013.

College career

SMU 
McCown played college football for SMU from 1998 to 2000, passing for 4,022 yards and 27 touchdowns, but also threw 34 interceptions. He started 25 total games for the Mustangs. He played in nine games, starting five, for the Mustangs his freshman season in 1998, completing 46 of 99 passes for 619 yards and seven touchdowns with eight interceptions. McCown split time with sophomore Chris Sanders in 1998. McCown was the first freshman to start at quarterback for the team since 1989. He started in 10 games for the Mustangs in 1999, completing 125 of 234 passes for 1,434 yards and 11 touchdowns with 10 interceptions. He set a school record for consecutive completions when he completed 19 passes in a row against Tulsa in 1999. McCown started nine games for the Mustangs his junior year in 2000, completing 169 of 331 passes for 1,969 yards and 9 touchdowns with 16 interceptions. He threw for 420 yards against Texas-El Paso in 2000, which was the third-highest total in SMU history. He started the first six games of the 2000 season before being replaced by David Page for three games. McCown then started the final three games for the Mustangs.

Sam Houston State 
McCown transferred his senior year to play for Sam Houston State. He transferred to be in an offense that threw more and to have a better chance to win. He surpassed his three-year SMU touchdown total in just one season for the Bearkats, completing 259 of 429 passes for 3,481 yards and 32 touchdowns with 12 interceptions as a senior in 2001. The Bearkats finished the season with a 10–3 record and were Southland Football League co-champions with McNeese State. Sam Houston State defeated Northern Arizona in the first round of the Division I-AA national playoffs to reach the I-AA quarterfinals, where the Bearkats lost to eventual national champion Montana. He set single-season school records in pass completions, attempts, yards, and touchdowns. McCown's 3,481 passing yards ranked eighth on the school's career list. He also rushed for 351 yards and six touchdowns on 112 attempts. He threw for 404 yards and tied a school single-game record with five touchdowns against Western Illinois in 2001. McCown was named the SFL Player of the Year and earned First Team All-SFL honors in 2001. He was also named a Third Team Division I-AA All-American by The Sports Network. Following his senior season, he was one of 16 players considered for the Walter Payton Award, given to the top performer in NCAA Division I-AA football. McCown finished seventh in the Walter Payton Award voting. He replaced Joey Harrington on the 2002 Senior Bowl roster after Harrington suffered a knee injury in the East–West Shrine Game. McCown played in the Senior Bowl and had a "strong game", completing 7 of 11 passes for 117 yards while also rushing for a 12-yard touchdown. He majored in history at Sam Houston State. McCown was inducted into the Sam Houston Athletic Hall of Honor in 2013.

College statistics

Professional career

Arizona Cardinals 
McCown had an impressive performance at the NFL Combine, which saw him post a 40-yard dash in the mid-4-second range, a 10-foot long jump, and a -inch vertical jump. One scout who attended the combine said, "He could be the third quarterback taken or the eighth quarterback." McCown was rated the sixth-best quarterback in the 2002 NFL Draft by NFLDraftScout.com. He was drafted by the Arizona Cardinals in the third round of the 2002 NFL Draft, with the 81st overall pick, and was the fourth quarterback selected. Dave McGinnis, the head coach of the Cardinals when McCown was drafted, later stated, "[McCown] had all the background essentials you really liked. And he's a fabulous athlete. If you were going to start a pickup basketball game in the building, he'd be one of your first choices." McCown played for the Cardinals from 2002 to 2005.

Entering his rookie season, McCown became the team's second-string quarterback after former Cardinals backup Chris Greisen was released in August. McCown made his NFL debut on December 1 against the Kansas City Chiefs, relieving starter Jake Plummer late in the third quarter of an eventual 49–0 loss. McCown played in two games in 2002, completing 7-of-18 passes for 66 yards with two interceptions. He also rushed once for 20 yards.

2003 

In 2003, McCown was the backup to Jeff Blake for the first 13 games of the season. On September 14 against the Seattle Seahawks, McCown completed 18 of 32 passes for 150 yards with two interceptions after relieving the injured Blake late in the first quarter of an eventual 38–0 loss. Prior to the game against the San Francisco 49ers on December 7, the Cardinals reportedly would play both starter Blake and McCown in the game. Blake played the first half, completing 8 of 20 passes for 59 yards and one interception. McCown then played the second half, completing 11 of 20 passes for 120 yards and two touchdowns as the Cardinals lost 50–14. McCown was then promoted to starter and started the final three games of the season. Head coach Dave McGinnis stated, "Josh is the right decision professionally for our organization," and  "Some quality time is what he needs against good teams ... and it's important to find out what we have there." In the final game of the season on December 28 against the Minnesota Vikings, McCown threw a game-winning 28-yard touchdown pass to wide receiver Nate Poole as time expired to beat the Vikings by a score of 18–17. The Vikings would have made the playoffs if they had won the game, but the Green Bay Packers made the playoffs in their place. The Packers also invited McCown and Poole to attend their first playoff game. While McCown declined the invitation due to the birth of his third child, Poole attended the game and was presented with a key to the city. McCown played in eight games, with three starts, in 2003 and completed 95 of 166 passes for 1,018 yards and five touchdowns with six interceptions. He also rushed for a career-high 158 yards and a touchdown on 28 carries.

2004 
On February 4, 2004, new head coach Dennis Green named McCown the team's starter for the 2004 season. McCown started the first nine games of the season for the Cardinals, leading the team to a 4–5 record. Against the Atlanta Falcons on September 26, he completed 20 of 26 passes for a then-career high completion level of 76.9%, but he also lost three fumbles and was benched in favor of Shaun King in the fourth quarter as the Cardinals lost 6–3. McCown threw for a then career-high three touchdowns on October 10 against the San Francisco 49ers. During McCown's ninth consecutive start on November 14 against the New York Giants, McCown completed 12 of 24 passes for only 90 yards, though the Cardinals won the game 17–14. McCown was then benched, with King replacing him as the team's starting quarterback. King then started the next two games for the Cardinals while McCown was second-string. After King's two starts, he was benched in favor of John Navarre. Navarre then started one game for the team, during which McCown was second-string and King was third-string. After Navarre's one start, he was benched in favor of McCown, who then started the final four games of the season. McCown threw for 307 yards against the 49ers on December 12, which was his first career 300-yard game. He also threw three touchdowns against the Seattle Seahawks on December 26, his second three-passing-touchdown game of the year. McCown played in 14 games, starting 13, in 2004 and completed 233 of 408 passes for 2,511 yards and 11 touchdowns with 10 interceptions. He also rushed for 112 yards and two touchdowns on 36 carries. The Cardinals finished the year third in the NFC West with a 6–10 record and were 6–7 in games that McCown started.

2005 
In March 2005, the Cardinals signed quarterback Kurt Warner. Later the same month, McCown also signed a one-year contract extension with the team. In May 2005, coach Green officially named Warner the team's starter and McCown the second-stringer for the 2005 season.
Warner started the first three games of the season. In the third game against the Seattle Seahawks on September 25, 2005, Warner suffered an injury late in the second quarter and was relieved by McCown. McCown then started the next four games for the Cardinals. During the first game of that stretch, he started for the Cardinals at the first NFL regular season game outside the United States, played at Estadio Azteca on October 2, 2005, against the San Francisco 49ers. He completed 32 of 46 passes for a then-career high 385 yards and two touchdowns as the Cardinals won by a score of 31–14. The game in Mexico City had an attendance of 103,467, setting a record for the largest attendance for a regular-season game in NFL history. The record has since been broken, but is still second place all-time. McCown's next start was against the Carolina Panthers on October 9, in which he completed 29 of 36 passes for a new career-high of 398 yards with two touchdowns and three interceptions as the Cardinals lost by a score of 24–20. His two 300-yard games were two of the four highest passing totals of any player during the 2005 season. McCown also became the first Cardinals quarterback to throw for 350 yards in back-to-back games. Warner then returned from injury, but was McCown's backup for the next two games.  McCown played poorly, though, and Warner was promoted to starter again. Warner then started the next seven games. In Warner's seventh start back against the Houston Texans on December 18, he suffered an injury early in the first quarter and stayed in the game for two more series before being relieved by McCown, but McCown also ended up leaving the game with flu-like symptoms at halftime and was replaced by John Navarre. McCown then started the final two games of the season. He played in 9 games, starting 6, in 2005 and completed 163 of 279 passes for 1,836 and 9 touchdowns with 11 interceptions. He also rushed 29 times for 139 yards. The Cardinals finished the year 3rd in the NFC West with a 5–11 record and were 3–3 in games that McCown started. The Cardinals also led the league in passing offense in 2005 with 4,437 yards, with Warner throwing for 2,713 yards, McCown throwing for 1,836 yards and Navarre throwing for 174 yards.

McCown became a free agent after the 2005 season. He played in 33 games, starting 22, during his tenure with the team, and completed 498 of 862 passes for 5,431 yards and 25 touchdowns with 29 interceptions. He also rushed 94 times for 429 yards and three touchdowns. The Cardinals were 10–12 in games that McCown started.

Detroit Lions 
In March 2006, McCown signed a two-year contract worth $6 million with the Detroit Lions, believing he would have the chance to start. In July, however, Jon Kitna was named the starter entering training camp, and McCown was named the backup. McCown was Kitna's backup for all 16 games in 2006. During the season, McCown began running wide-receiver routes during practice and became skilled at it. He lined up at wide receiver for one play against the Arizona Cardinals on November 19. He saw extended time at wide receiver during the game against the New England Patriots on December 3. McCown was inserted into the game as the third wide receiver and was targeted twice, catching both passes for a total of 15 yards. He also had a 31-yard reception, but it was brought back after McCown was called for offensive pass interference. In reference to playing wide receiver, McCown later said, "It was a surreal moment and it changed my whole perception and respect for receivers."

After the 2006 season, McCown asked to be traded. His agent, Michael McCartney, said, "Josh sees himself as a starting quarterback, and I agree with
him." On April 28, 2007, the Lions drafted quarterback Drew Stanton in the 2007 NFL Draft. Later the same day, McCown and wide receiver Mike Williams were traded to the Oakland Raiders in exchange for a 2007 fourth-round draft pick, which the Lions used to select cornerback A. J. Davis.

Oakland Raiders 
McCown was involved in a quarterback competition with Daunte Culpepper and Andrew Walter to see who would be the Raiders' starter for the 2007 season. On August 27, head coach Lane Kiffin narrowed the choices down to McCown or Culpepper. On September 5, a day after Kiffin had informed the quarterbacks, Kiffin privately informed the team that McCown would be the starter, though he did not publicly name the starter until the day of the Week 1 game against the Detroit Lions on September 9, explaining, "It's simply a matter of always trying to gain a competitive advantage."

In Week 1, McCown threw for 313 yards with two touchdowns and two interceptions in a 36–21 loss. He also fumbled late in the game to end the Raiders' attempt at a comeback. McCown sprained his right foot in the first half of the Lions game and injured his right index finger on the final play of the game. By game time of the Week 2 contest against the Denver Broncos, even though McCown was still nursing the finger injury, Kiffin felt McCown's foot had healed enough for him to play. McCown started the game, throwing for 73 yards, 1one touchdown, and three interceptions. McCown then started the next game against the Miami Dolphins, but after suffering a left foot injury, he was relieved by Culpepper to start the second half. Culpepper then started the team's next four games in place of McCown. During the fourth game of that stretch against the Tennessee Titans, though he was not 100% healed, McCown served as Culpepper's backup. A few days after the Titans game, McCown was named the starter, with Kiffin stating, "I felt Daunte played really well for us, but with Josh coming back and looking healthy again, we're going to go back to Josh." McCown then started the next two games. Due to McCown's poor play, however, Culpepper was named the starter for the following game against the Minnesota Vikings. McCown also had a bruised thigh at the time of his benching, but that reportedly may not have been a major factor in the decision to start Culpepper, with Kiffin stating, "I felt it was time to go with Daunte and see if he can give us a little spark," and "It's nothing against Josh." McCown ended up being inactive for the Vikings game due to his injury. Culpepper then started the next game against the Kansas City Chiefs, but he suffered a sore quadriceps during the game that intensified later in the week. Due to his injury, Culpepper did not play in another game that season. McCown started the next game against the Denver Broncos. During the game, McCown threw for 141 yards, three touchdowns, no interceptions, and a then career-high 125.2 passer rating as the Raiders beat the Broncos by 34–20. McCown then started the next three games, but number-one overall draft pick JaMarcus Russell played the majority of McCown's third start. Russell also started the final game of the season.

McCown played in 9 games, all starts, in 2007, and completed 111 of 190 passes for 1,151 yards and 10 touchdowns with 11 interceptions, while also rushing for 143 yards. The Raiders finished the year with a 4–12 record and were 2–7 in games that McCown started. In 2007, he was the final winner of the NFL Quarterback Challenge. He became a free agent on February 29, 2008.

Miami Dolphins 
On February 29, 2008, McCown signed a two-year contract worth $6.25 million with the Miami Dolphins. A chance to compete for the starting job factored into his decision to sign with Miami. Prior to training camp in July, McCown needed six stitches in his throwing hand's index finger. He was holding firewood and his brother Luke accidentally grazed Josh's finger with a chainsaw.

On August 4, 2008, the Dolphins released their first depth chart of the season and had McCown listed as the starter over John Beck and Chad Henne. However, head coach Tony Sparano said that Beck and Henne had not been ruled out as potential starters for the team's first preseason game on August 9. Free agent quarterback Chad Pennington signed with the Dolphins on August 8 and was expected to be the team's starter. McCown played in the team's first preseason game on August 9 but not until the fourth quarter of the contest. He then failed to appear in the team's final three preseason games. Pennington was officially named the team's starter on August 25, before the team's last preseason game on August 28. Before the start of the regular season, McCown was traded to the Carolina Panthers on August 29.

Carolina Panthers 

On August 29, 2008, the Carolina Panthers acquired McCown from the Dolphins for a seventh-round pick (#237 overall) in the 2009 NFL Draft. The move came a day after Panthers quarterback Matt Moore suffered a leg injury. However, general manager Marty Hurney said that the trade for McCown was not in response to Moore's injury, with Hurney stating, "Josh is a guy that we've liked for the last several years when he was in unrestricted free agency." McCown was the backup to Jake Delhomme for all 16 games in 2008. He was also the backup for the team's NFC Divisional Round loss to the Arizona Cardinals. He played in two games in 2008. He relieved Delhomme late in the fourth quarter of a 24–9 win against the Atlanta Falcons, but the only statistics he recorded were three end-of-game kneeldowns. He also relieved Delhomme early in the fourth quarter of a 34–0 win against the Kansas City Chiefs, but he only recorded one end-of-game kneeldown.

McCown beat out Moore for the primary backup quarterback job in 2009. In Week 1 against the Philadelphia Eagles on September 13, McCown entered the game late in the third quarter in relief of Delhomme, who had committed five turnovers. McCown completed one of six passes for 2 yards before spraining both his left knee and left foot on the same play early in the fourth quarter. McCown was then relieved by Moore as the Panthers lost to the Eagles by a score of 38–10. McCown was placed on injured reserve on September 14, ending his season. He became a free agent in March 2010.

Hartford Colonials 
McCown was signed by the Hartford Colonials of the United Football League (UFL) on August 3, 2010. He received an offer from the Chicago Bears shortly after signing with the Colonials, but decided to stay with the Colonials due to wanting to honor his contract and to receive more playing time. Regarding honoring his contract, McCown later said, "It just didn't sit well with me" and that he felt it would be a bad example to his kids to say, "Give your word to somebody until something better comes along and then break that." In 2011, McCown said, "I think I'm further along now than I would have been if I would have just sat on an (NFL) roster last year and been a backup because I played eight games," and "I think you're only getting better when you're taking reps, so I really valued that." McCown threw for 265 yards and three touchdowns in the season-opening 27–10 victory over the Sacramento Mountain Lions. He was named the Offensive Player of the Week for Week 1. In Week 2, he completed 22 of 25 passes for 264 yards and two touchdowns. In Week 4, he threw for 223 yards, with one touchdown and one interception. McCown passed for 1,463 yards and 10 touchdowns with eight interceptions in eight games during the 2010 season. His 79.3 passer rating was the highest in the UFL in 2010. The Colonials finished the year with a 3–5 record. He was a team captain while with the Colonials.

San Francisco 49ers 
On August 17, 2011, McCown signed a one-year contract for the minimum of $810,000 with the San Francisco 49ers. He was released by the 49ers on September 3, 2011.

Chicago Bears

2011 

On November 23, 2011, McCown signed with the Chicago Bears, as a backup to Caleb Hanie, after an injury to starting quarterback Jay Cutler. On December 18, 2011, McCown came in for Hanie with five minutes left in the fourth quarter of a 38–14 loss to the Seattle Seahawks at Soldier Field. McCown threw twice, one for a 12-yard gain, and the other was intercepted. On December 21, 2011, the Bears announced that McCown would start on the Christmas Day game against the defending champion Green Bay Packers, due to Hanie's struggles since taking over for the injured Cutler. McCown completed 19-of-28 passes for 242 yards with a touchdown and two interceptions in the 35–21 loss. In Week 17 against the Minnesota Vikings, McCown completed 15-of-20 passes for 160 yards with a touchdown and a pick with a 75.4 passer rating, but was sacked seven times. The Bears won 17–13.

2012 

On March 14, 2012, McCown was signed to a one-year deal by the Bears, and was reassigned a new number from 15 to 12 after Brandon Marshall joined the team before McCown signed. On August 31, McCown was waived by the team. On November 12, McCown was again re-signed by the Bears after starting quarterback Jay Cutler sustained a concussion. McCown then was Jason Campbell's backup for the game against the San Francisco 49ers on November 19. Cutler then returned from injury and McCown was inactive as the third-string quarterback for the final six games of the season.

2013 
Despite becoming an unrestricted free agent in 2013, on March 29, McCown signed a one-year deal with the Bears. In Week 7 against the Washington Redskins, McCown entered the game in the second quarter after Cutler suffered a groin injury. McCown completed 14 of 20 passes for 204 yards and a touchdown to Martellus Bennett, but the Bears lost 45–41. On November 4, McCown, starting in place of the injured Cutler, led the Bears to a victory over the rival Green Bay Packers on Monday Night Football. McCown threw for 272 yards and two touchdowns en route to a 27–20 victory. Cutler started the Week 10 game against the Detroit Lions and suffered an ankle injury in the second quarter but stayed in the game. However, with Cutler's ankle potentially limiting his mobility for the two-minute drill, he was replaced by McCown for the final drive. McCown then guided the Bears to a 74-yard touchdown drive, completing 6 of 9 passes for 62 yards and an 11-yard touchdown to Brandon Marshall. However, the Bears lost 21–19. McCown started his second game against the Ravens, completing 19 of 31 passes for 216 yards with one touchdown and a 92.9 passer rating in a 23–20 victory, compiling in four games 754 yards, five touchdowns, no interceptions and a 100.0 passer rating. McCown started Week 12 against the St. Louis Rams and completed a franchise-record 36 passes for 352 yards, two touchdowns and an interception. The next week against the Minnesota Vikings, McCown threw for a season-high 355 yards, completing 23 of 36 passes for two touchdowns and a 114.9 rating. In Week 14 against the Dallas Cowboys, McCown threw for a career-high four touchdowns and ran for another while completing 27 of 36 passes for 348 yards and a career-high 141.9 passer rating en route to a 45–28 victory. McCown became the first Bears quarterback to score five touchdowns in a game since Jack Concannon in 1970. McCown was  named NFC Offensive Player of the Week. He was also the first Bears quarterback to throw for 300 yards in three straight games. Cutler then returned from injury to start the final three games of the season.

McCown ended the 2013 season completing 66.5% of his passes for 1,829 yards with 13 touchdowns, one interception, and a 109.0 passer rating, the third-highest behind Peyton Manning and Nick Foles and the best in Bears history. He had the NFL's lowest interception percentage at 0.4%. The combination of McCown and Cutler set Bears records with 32 touchdown passes, 4,450 yards, a 64.4 completion percentage and a 96.9 passer rating. The Bears finished the season with an 8–8 record and were 3–2 in games that McCown started. On January 24, 2014, McCown was named to the USA Today All-Joe Team. He was awarded the Brian Piccolo Award by the Bears in May 2014.

Tampa Bay Buccaneers 
On March 12, 2014, McCown signed a two-year, $10 million contract with the Tampa Bay Buccaneers. Another $5 million was available based on playoff appearances and playing time. He was immediately named the starter by new Buccaneers head coach and his former head coach in Chicago, Lovie Smith. In Week 3 against the Atlanta Falcons, he suffered a thumb injury late in the second quarter and was replaced by Mike Glennon. Glennon took over as the starter in Week 4, leading the Buccaneers to a 27–24 win over the Pittsburgh Steelers but lost the next four games. McCown then returned from injury and started the final eight games of the season. He threw for 2,206 yards, eleven touchdowns, and fourteen interceptions while also rushing for 127 yards and three touchdowns in eleven games, all starts, during the 2014 season. The Buccaneers finished the year with a 2–14 record and were 1–10 in games that McCown started. McCown was a team captain while with the Buccaneers. On February 11, 2015, after underperforming, he was released after just one season with the Buccaneers.

Cleveland Browns

2015 

On February 27, 2015, McCown signed a three-year contract worth $14 million with the Cleveland Browns. In May 2015, head coach Mike Pettine said that McCown was No. 1 on the depth chart at quarterback.

McCown started the Week 1 game against the New York Jets. At the end of his first drive, he made a 13-yard run and tried to jump into the endzone, but he fumbled inches away from the goal line and was taken out of the game due to a concussion.  McCown returned from his injury in a Week 3 game against the Oakland Raiders on September 27, where he threw for 341 yards, 2 touchdowns, and 1 interception as the Browns lost by a score of 27–20. His brother Luke also started for the New Orleans Saints the same day, marking the first time both McCown brothers had started on the same day since December 9, 2007. Josh then threw for 356 yards and 2 touchdowns against the San Diego Chargers but the Browns lost by a score of 30–27. In a 33–30 overtime victory over the Baltimore Ravens in Week 5, he set a new career high and the Browns record for passing yards in a regular season game with 457 as the Browns moved to 2–3 while McCown was named the AFC Offensive Player of the Week. This was the Browns' first victory in Baltimore since the 2007 season. McCown also became the first player in NFL history to record more than 450 passing yards, two passing touchdowns, a rushing touchdown, and no interceptions in one game. He was also the first player in Browns history to pass for more than 300 yards in three straight games and his 1,154 yards set a record for most in a three-game span in franchise history, surpassing the former record of 1,038 set by Brian Sipe in 1980. The jerseys that McCown and teammate Gary Barnidge wore during the Week 5 Ravens game were sent to, and displayed, at the Pro Football Hall of Fame. McCown then started the next three games of the season. During the second game of that stretch against the St. Louis Rams, McCown hurt his ribs on a hard hit but stayed in the game for three more plays before suffering a shoulder injury and leaving the game with 5:17 left in the fourth quarter. On October 30, prior to the game against the Arizona Cardinals on November 1, McCown was listed as questionable with shoulder and rib injuries. He ended up starting the game, passing for 211 yards and a season-high 3 touchdowns, which all came in the first half, as the Browns lost by a score of 34–20. McCown also took several hard hits early in the third quarter, exacerbating his rib injury from the previous week. However, he stayed in the game until leaving late in the fourth quarter. Due to McCown's injury, Johnny Manziel started the next two games. On November 17, Manziel, coming off a 372-yard performance against the Pittsburgh Steelers, was named the starter for the rest of the season, but McCown was promoted to starter again after a video surfaced online of Manziel partying. In the ensuing Week 12 rematch against the Ravens on December 1, McCown broke his collarbone late in the third quarter and stayed in for two plays before leaving the game. On December 2, it was announced that McCown would miss the rest of the season with the injury. He was placed on injured reserve the same day. He threw for 2,109 yards, twelve touchdowns, and four interceptions while also rushing for 98 yards and one touchdown in eight games during the 2015 season. The Browns finished the year with a 3–13 record and were 1–7 in games that McCown started, despite him posting a passer rating of 93.3 on the season. He was the Browns nominee for the Art Rooney Sportsmanship Award in 2015. The local chapter of the Pro Football Writers of America named McCown its Dino Lucarelli Good Guy Award winner.

2016 

Robert Griffin III signed with the Browns in March 2016 and was widely expected to be the team's starter. On August 8, 2016, head coach Hue Jackson officially named Griffin the starter for the 2016 season.

A day after the Browns' Week 1 game, the team announced that Griffin would miss at least eight games due to an injury he suffered during the contest. McCown then started the Week 2 game against the Baltimore Ravens, throwing for 260 yards and two touchdowns with two interceptions in the 25–20 loss. McCown also fractured his left collarbone in the Ravens game but played through the entire game. He returned from his injury on October 30,  throwing for 341 yards and 2 touchdowns with 2 interceptions as the Browns lost 31–28 to the New York Jets. He threw for 228 yards in the first half, which was the most by a Browns quarterback in the first half since 1986. On November 1, McCown and Cody Kessler, who had started in place of McCown and was returning from injury, were listed as co-starters on the Browns unofficial depth chart. On November 4, Kessler was named the Browns' starter for the next game, with Jackson saying "I need to know" if he's the Browns quarterback of the future. On November 10 against the Baltimore Ravens, McCown threw for 59 yards with no touchdowns and two interceptions after entering the game early in the third quarter due to Kessler being benched. On November 20 against the Pittsburgh Steelers, he threw for 188 yards and one touchdown in relief of an injured Kessler. On November 27 against the New York Giants, he started due to Kessler's injury and threw for 322 yards and 1 touchdown. Griffin then returned from his injury to start the final four games of the season while McCown was inactive as the third-string quarterback for the final four games. McCown played in five games, starting three, during the 2016 season and completed 90 of 165 passes for 1,100 yards with 6 touchdowns and 6 interceptions. On February 7, 2017, McCown was released by the Browns.

New York Jets

2017
On March 20, 2017, McCown signed a one-year, $6 million contract with the New York Jets. On August 28, 2017, after battling Christian Hackenberg and Bryce Petty, McCown was named the starting quarterback to begin the 2017 season. McCown won three straight starts from Week 3 to Week 5; the first time in McCown's NFL career that he won three straight starts. During Week 7 against the Miami Dolphins, he threw for 209 yards, three touchdowns, and one interception as the Jets lost by a score of 31–28. He also scored a rushing touchdown, becoming the first Jets quarterback since Al Dorow in 1960 to score three passing touchdowns and one rushing touchdown in a game. He threw nine touchdowns from Week 5 to Week 8, becoming the first Jets quarterback since Ray Lucas in 1999 to throw multiple touchdowns in four straight games.  During Week 10, he became the oldest quarterback in NFL history to set a career-high for touchdown passes in a season with his 14th touchdown pass. During Week 13 against the Kansas City Chiefs, McCown threw for 331 yards and a touchdown while also rushing for 2 touchdowns as the Jets won by a score of 38–31. He joined Doug Flutie and Jim Thorpe as the only players in NFL history to rush for at least two touchdowns in a game at the age of 38 or older. McCown was named the AFC Offensive Player of the Week for Week 13. During Week 14 against the Denver Broncos, McCown threw for 46 yards while also turning the ball over twice on an interception and a fumble before leaving the game late in the third quarter after an apparent hand injury as the Jets lost by a score of 23–0. Shortly after the game, it was revealed that McCown had suffered a broken left hand. The next day, head coach Todd Bowles announced that McCown would undergo surgery on his left hand, putting him out for the remainder of the 2017 season. He was placed on injured reserve on December 12. McCown played in 13 games, all starts, in 2017 and completed 267 of 397 passes for 2,926 yards, 18 touchdowns and nine interceptions while also rushing for 124 yards and five touchdowns. His completions, passing yards, passing touchdowns and rushing touchdowns were all single-season career highs. He also had a career-high 67.3 completion percentage. He had a 5–8 record as the starter in 2017. He was named the Curtis Martin Jets Team MVP and the Kyle Clifton "Good Guy" Award winner.

2018
On March 13, 2018, McCown signed a one-year, $10 million contract to remain with the Jets. During training camp and the subsequent preseason, McCown competed with Teddy Bridgewater and rookie Sam Darnold for the starting job. Eventually, Darnold was named the team's starter after Bridgewater was traded to the New Orleans Saints, solidifying McCown's role as the primary backup going into the 2018 season. With Darnold inactive due to a right foot injury, McCown started in Week 10 against the Buffalo Bills, where he finished with 135 passing yards and two interceptions as the Jets lost 10–41. Following a bye week, the Jets played against the New England Patriots in Week 12, where McCown finished with 276 passing yards, a touchdown, and an interception as the Jets lost 13–27. During Week 13 against the Tennessee Titans, McCown finished with 128 passing yards and an interception as the Jets lost 22–26. Darnold returned from his injury and started the remainder of the 2018 season for the Jets.

Philadelphia Eagles 
McCown had previously announced his retirement and was subsequently hired by ESPN as an NFL analyst. However, on August 17, 2019, McCown signed with the Philadelphia Eagles following injuries to the team's backup quarterbacks, Nate Sudfeld and Cody Kessler. In Week 2, against the Atlanta Falcons, McCown briefly came into the game to relieve an injured Carson Wentz for a few plays. In Week 14, against the New York Giants, McCown almost entered the game as a wide receiver due to injuries among the Eagles' receiver corps. McCown mentored Wentz, and also helped several wide receivers make the transition from the practice squad to the active roster, as the Eagles won four straight games to win the division title and reach the playoffs after a 5–7 start marred by numerous injuries.

In the Wild Card Round of the 2019–20 NFL playoffs, McCown came in for injured Carson Wentz after a helmet-to-helmet collision with the Seattle Seahawks Jadeveon Clowney. McCown became the oldest quarterback to make his postseason debut, passing Vince Evans, whose postseason debut was at 35 years and 220 days old. McCown completed his first-ever playoff pass at the age of 40, the first player to do so since Sonny Jurgensen in 1974. McCown went 18-of-24 for 174 yards for a 94.8 passer rating with no touchdowns nor turnovers, while rushing six times for 23 yards and being sacked 6 times, leading an injury-depleted Eagles offense to three field goals in a 17–9 loss to the visiting Seahawks.  He later revealed during an interview that he tore his hamstring off of the bone in the second quarter, but continued to play.

Following the playoff loss, the Eagles offered McCown a role on the team's coaching staff for the 2020 season, but he declined, as he was still interested in continuing his playing career. On September 6, 2020, the Eagles signed McCown to their practice squad to serve as an emergency quarterback, making him the oldest practice squad player in NFL history.

Houston Texans 
On November 7, 2020, McCown was signed by the Houston Texans off the Eagles' practice squad. He interviewed for the Texans' head coach position on January 22, 2021, but the team hired David Culley instead. He was released on March 1, 2021. He interviewed again for the Texans' head coach position on January 20, 2022, after Culley was fired, but was again passed over, this time for Lovie Smith.

NFL career statistics

Regular season

Playoffs

UFL

Coaching career

Early career
McCown previously spent time as a volunteer quarterbacks coach for the Marvin Ridge High School Mavericks of Waxhaw, North Carolina. The team's head coach said "He just walked into my office one day and asked if he could help out." In 2010, prior to signing with the Colonials, McCown began helping the Mavericks during the offseason. After the 2010 UFL season ended, McCown spent another offseason volunteering with the Mavericks. He then left the school upon being signed by the 49ers in August 2011 but returned once the 49ers released him in September 2011. Several days after Marvin Ridge lost its playoff game in November 2011, McCown was signed by the Bears. McCown was released by the Bears in August 2012 and immediately upon arriving home at the airport, McCown went straight to a Marvin Ridge game and joined the team while the game was in progress. Similarly, days after Marvin Ridge lost its playoff game in November 2012, McCown was again signed by the Bears. McCown also spent time as the scout team quarterback while at Marvin Ridge, with one player saying "I don't think anybody in the country had a better scout-team quarterback." McCown also cooked pancakes for the Fellowship of Christian Athletes breakfasts on Fridays and spent time teaching gym class at Marvin Ridge.

McCown served as an assistant coach at Myers Park High School in Charlotte where his sons play. With his 2019 return to the NFL, the Eagles allowed him to fly to Charlotte on Mondays for high school practice and game planning, and then again on Fridays for game days.

Following the 2021 season, McCown was interviewed for the Texans' head coaching vacancy following the firing of David Culley. He was later announced as a finalist for the position, however the job later went to Lovie Smith.

Carolina Panthers
On February 10, 2023, McCown was hired by the Carolina Panthers as their quarterbacks coach under head coach Frank Reich.

Personal life
During the 2017 offseason, McCown, his wife Natalie, and their four children moved from Waxhaw, North Carolina to Waxahachie, Texas. He is a Christian. He grew up a Dallas Cowboys fan. His inspiration for wearing No. 12, the jersey number that he wore the majority of his career, comes from Roger Staubach, who also wore No. 12. He was also a fan of Cowboys players Michael Irvin, Emmitt Smith, and Troy Aikman, as well as quarterbacks Joe Montana, John Elway, and Randall Cunningham.

McCown is the older brother of former NFL quarterback Luke McCown and younger brother of former Texas A&M quarterback Randy McCown. In 2003, the McCown brothers hosted the first-ever McCown Passing Camp in their hometown of Jacksonville, Texas. He is also the father of UTSA Roadrunners quarterback Owen McCown.

McCown is a member of the Fellowship of Christian Athletes. He has served in Pro Athletes Outreach and Coaches Time Out, which are both ministries. He has also spent time speaking to church youth and men's groups during the offseason.

Notes

References

External links
 Carolina Panthers profile
 
 
Collegiate statistics at Sports-Reference.com

1979 births
Living people
American football quarterbacks
American football wide receivers
Arizona Cardinals players
Carolina Panthers coaches
Carolina Panthers players
Chicago Bears players
Cleveland Browns players
Coaches of American football from Texas
Detroit Lions players
Hartford Colonials players
High school football coaches in North Carolina
Houston Texans players
Miami Dolphins players
New York Jets players
Oakland Raiders players
People from Jacksonville, Texas
People from Waxahachie, Texas
Philadelphia Eagles players
Players of American football from Texas
Sam Houston Bearkats football players
San Francisco 49ers players
SMU Mustangs football players
Sportspeople from the Dallas–Fort Worth metroplex
Tampa Bay Buccaneers players
Brian Piccolo Award winners